William Frederick "Woody" Woodward (born September 23, 1942) is an American former professional baseball player, college baseball coach, and general manager. He played in Major League Baseball, primarily as a shortstop from 1963 to 1971 for the Atlanta Braves and the Cincinnati Reds. Woodward is better known for his tenure as general manager of the Seattle Mariners.

Playing career
Woodward played baseball at Coral Gables Senior High School and led the team to the 1960 Class AA state title. He attended Florida State University, where he played for the Florida State Seminoles baseball team. In 1963 he was named third-team All-American and was named to the College World Series all-tournament squad.

During his Major League Baseball career, Woodward played for the Milwaukee/Atlanta Braves (1963–68) and the Cincinnati Reds (1968–71). A shortstop and second baseman, Woodward appeared in 880 games with 517 hits. He had a career .236 batting average with one home run and 148 runs batted in. He was acquired along with Tony Cloninger and Clay Carroll by the Reds from the Atlanta Braves for Milt Pappas, Bob Johnson and Ted Davidson on June 11, 1968.

On July 10, 1970, Woodward hit his only major league home run in 2,423 plate appearances, a two-run shot off Ron Reed against the Atlanta Braves. Afterwards Woodward was quoted as saying, "If I hit one home run per every seven seasons, it will take me 4,998 seasons to catch Babe Ruth." He played in four games of the 1970 World Series, which the Reds lost to the Baltimore Orioles in five games, with Woodward totaling one hit in five at bats.

Woodward was involved in a bizarre incident on September 4, 1971. During a game against the Dodgers at Dodger Stadium, a sack of flour fell out of the sky and landed approximately 10 feet from where Woodward was standing.

Post-playing career
After a brief stint as Reds TV commentator, Woodward returned to FSU from 1975 to 1978 as head baseball coach, where his teams earned three NCAA tournament bids and one College World Series bid. After working as an assistant general manager for both the Cincinnati Reds and New York Yankees, Woodward was named the general manager of the New York Yankees in October 1986. His resignation at the end of the 1987 season led to a flurry of moves as then-manager Lou Piniella was promoted to general manager, and (for the fifth time) Billy Martin was named Yankees manager.

The Philadelphia Phillies hired Woodward as general manager in October 1987, and fired him in June 1988. Phillies president Bill Giles refused to cite a reason for the termination after just six months. "It was a philosophical difference and that was the bottom line," said Woodward, who said he was 'shocked and disappointed' by his dismissal.

The next month, in July 1988, he became the general manager of the Seattle Mariners, working there until his retirement at the end of 1999. During his tenure, the Mariners made the playoffs in 1995 and 1997. His draft picks included Alex Rodriguez, Jason Varitek, Derek Lowe, Bret Boone and Raúl Ibañez. Perhaps his most notable trade was in 1989, acquiring Randy Johnson from the Montreal Expos (or trading away David Ortiz). In January 2009 the Mariners hired him to work as a part-time scout.

He is a 1981 inductee of the Florida State University Athletic Hall of Fame.

References

External links

Woody Woodward at SABR (Baseball BioProject)
Woody Woodward at Baseball Library
Woody Woodward at Baseball America Executive Database

Major League Baseball shortstops
Milwaukee Braves players
Cincinnati Reds players
Atlanta Braves players
Major League Baseball general managers
Cincinnati Reds executives
New York Yankees executives
Philadelphia Phillies executives
Seattle Mariners executives
Seattle Mariners scouts
Texas Rangers scouts
Major League Baseball broadcasters
Cincinnati Reds announcers
Denver Bears players
Atlanta Crackers players
Florida State Seminoles baseball players
Florida State Seminoles baseball coaches
Baseball players from Miami
Sports coaches from Miami
1942 births
Living people
Coral Gables Senior High School alumni